The Alliance Colony was a Jewish agricultural community that was founded  on May 10, 1882, in Pittsgrove Township, in Salem County, New Jersey, United States. It was named after the Alliance Israélite Universelle of Paris and was funded by the Hebrew Immigrant Aid Society of New York and Philadelphia and The Baron De Hirsch Fund.

History 
Following the assassination of Tsar Alexander II, numerous pogroms targeting Russian Jews prompted many families to emigrate. Many began their lives in America in tenements on Manhattan's Lower East Side. As the numbers of Jewish people in America increased there was a strong desire to leave the confinement and crowded conditions in the cities. Some Jewish thinkers and community leaders proclaimed that recent Jewish immigrants ought "to become tillers of the soil and thus shake off the accusation that we were petty mercenaries living upon the toil of others." They settled in communities across the country, but many wished to continue living in predominately Jewish areas. These immigrants recognized that self-sufficiency would be paramount to their survival, which led them into agriculture.  Alliance was founded by a core group of 43 settlers but many more followed and, by the end of the first summer, there were 60-70 families living in the colony.

The immigrant colony members had little knowledge of agriculture and had difficulty farming the sandy South Jersey soil but received training from their neighbors. The HIAS paid workers weekly during the period in which land was cleared. Initially, Alliance was also supported by local politicians who arranged for 1,000+ army tents for the community for shelter until permanent housing could be built.

Community makeup 
The Alliance Colony was primarily a farming community but also included various craftsmen, such as cabinetmaking, blacksmithing and masonry. Eventually a clothing factory was established, which is still in existence.

In 1901, there were 151 adults at Alliance and 345 children, 27 of whom were married.  There were 78 farms worth $135,250. The community owned  of land, of which 1,354 were cleared.

Alliance focused on education, building several well recognized schools as well as four synagogues--at least one of which still is in operation--as well as a Jewish cemetery.

Today 
All of the Jewish Agricultural Societies of the late 19th century and early 20th century have faded away.

Remnants of Alliance Colony exist today, the cemetery is still in use for the Jewish communities in Cumberland and Salem Counties and is well maintained, the home of Moses Bayuk, the founder of the colony is still standing and there are plans to turn the property into a cultural center and museum.

The last known survivor of the Alliance Colony, Lillian Greenblatt Braun, celebrated her 100th birthday in 2005.  She died on October 20, 2015 at the age of 110.

The Jewish Federation of Cumberland, Gloucester & Salem Counties is currently working on building a Jewish Heritage Center on the property to commemorate the community's history, the history of Jews in America and their participation in farming.

The old Tifereth Israel synagogue, built in vernacular style in 1889 and disused in 1996, is  one of the few surviving 19th-century synagogues in the United States.

In 2017, William Levin, a descendant of Moses Bayuk, and his wife Malya Levin, publicly launched the Alliance Community Reboot project (also known as ACRe), in an effort to renew the agricultural life of the old Alliance Colony. They began a collaboration with local Jewish farmer Nathan Kleinman of the Experimental Farm Network, who planted various heritage grains and other heirloom plants on one of the fields owned by the Levins, close to the old Tifereth Israel synagogue. They plan to expand operations over the coming years.

Notable people

People who were born in, residents of, or otherwise closely associated with the Alliance Colony include:
 Stanley Brotman (1924–2014), a United States district judge of the United States District Court for the District of New Jersey.
 Joseph B. Perskie (1885–1957), Associate Justice of the New Jersey Supreme Court from 1933 to 1947.
 George Seldes (1890–1989), an American investigative journalist, foreign correspondent, editor, author, and media critic best known for the publication of the newsletter In Fact from 1940 to 1950.
 Gilbert Seldes (1893–1970), an American writer and cultural critic.

References

Communalism
History of New Jersey
Jewish-American history
Ashkenazi Jewish culture in New Jersey
Utopian communities in the United States
Historic Jewish communities in the United States
Populated places established in 1882
Russian-American culture in New Jersey
Russian-Jewish culture in the United States
1882 establishments in New Jersey
Ukrainian-Jewish culture in the United States
Pittsgrove Township, New Jersey